Alcobaça Ecological Reserve is an ecological reserve in the state of Rio de Janeiro, Brazil.

History

The reserve area was owned in the first decades of the 20th century by Jose Soares Maciel Filho, owner of a large textile mill.
After the plant went bankrupt the reserve area was sold in 1982 to the National Housing Bank, which planned to build 2,500 housing units.
Concern about the potential impact on water resources resulted in formation of ADMA – Associação em Defesa dos Mananciais do Alcobaça, which took responsibility for preserving the forest and managing water resources.
The Ecological Reserve was created by decree on 5 May 1988.
In 2005 the reserve was transferred to the Brazilian Institute of Environment and Renewable Natural Resources (Ibama).

Status

It lies in parts of the municipalities of Magé and Teresópolis in Rio de Janeiro.
The reserve is representative of the Atlantic Forest biome, and has primary forest tracts in excellent condition.

Notes

Sources

Ecological reserves of Brazil
Protected areas of Rio de Janeiro (state)
1988 establishments in Brazil
Protected areas established in 1988